Lorraine Ali is an American journalist and pundit who is a member of
the George Foster Peabody Awards board of jurors. Based in Los Angeles, California, she is a television critic at the Los Angeles Times, where she was previously a senior writer and music editor.  Her work has appeared in publications such as Rolling Stone, the New York Times, GQ, and Newsweek, where she was a senior writer and music critic from 2000 to 2009.

Background
Ali was born in Los Angeles California. Her father was an immigrant from Baghdad, Iraq and her mother a native Californian of French Canadian ancestry.

Career
Ali began her career in the 1990s writing about local Los Angeles music artists for the LA Weekly before becoming a regular writer with the Los Angeles Times under the editorship of Robert Hilburn. Ali's work was included in Da Capo's "Best Music Writing 2001."

Ali was a senior critic for Rolling Stone and a music columnist for Mademoiselle. She has written for  Esquire, SPIN, The Village Voice, Adweek, Entertainment Weekly, Harper’s Bazaar and Option. She wrote a car column for U.H.F in the 1990s before the alternative style magazine folded. Ali often appears as an expert voice on television. She has been interviewed on Oprah, Charlie Rose, CNN, BBC and other televised outlets discussing media, entertainment, culture, her relatives in Iraq and American-Muslim issues.

Since the Multi-National Force (sometimes called The Coalition) invasion of Iraq in 2003, Ali has published dozens of stories about her extended Iraqi family, the ensuing refugee crisis and President Donald Trump's 2017 travel ban. She has also written about the portrayal of Muslims in American media, film and television.

Awards
Ali was awarded an East West Center fellowship in 2016, and a Hedgebrook fellowship in 2011.
 
Her writing awards include Best Online Feature from the New York Association of Black Journalists in 2007, an Excellence in Journalism Award in 2002 from the National Arab Journalists Association. In 1996, she won Best National Feature Story honors at the Music Journalism Awards.

References

External links
 Lorraine Ali's web site
 Articles by Lorraine Ali

Year of birth missing (living people)
Living people
American writers of Iraqi descent
American people of French-Canadian descent
American magazine staff writers
American women editors
American editors
21st-century American women
American television critics
Los Angeles Times people